William Willard Gibson Jr.  (born in Amarillo, Texas,  March 5, 1932) received a B.A. in government (Plan II) in 1954 and an LL.B with honors in 1956 from the University of Texas at Austin.  During law school he was a member of the Order of the Coif and an editor of the Texas Law Review. Following graduation, he joined the firm of Gibson, Ochsner, Harlann, Kiney, & Morris in Amarillo, Texas as an associate partner. From 1964-65 he served as the President of the Junior Bar of the State of Texas. He was subsequently recruited by Dean W. Page Keeton of the University of Texas School of Law and joined the faculty in 1965.

Specializing in real property and estates, Professor Gibson taught courses in Texas land titles, real estate transactions, real estate finance, insurance, Texas procedure, wills and estates, fraud and mistake, and professional responsibility.

From 1971-73 Professor Gibson took a leave of absence to serve as an attorney advisor to the Federal Power Commission.
In 1983 he was named Sylvan Lang Professor of Law.   In addition to his teaching duties, he served as Associate Dean for Administration and Associate Dean for Academic Affairs.

Professor Gibson contributed to continuing legal education in Texas in a variety of ways. He was one of the founders of the Mortgage Lending Institute (which was later named in his honor) and helped establish standards for continuing legal education in Texas.

The Texas Supreme Court appointed Professor Gibson as Provost of Judicial Education from 1992-93 where he conducted a study of current judicial education programs and recommended courses of action for improving Texas judicial education.

Professor Gibson has received numerous honors, including being named a charter member of the American College of Real Estate Lawyers, an academic fellow of the American College of Probate Counsel, a charter member of the Texas Real Estate Academy, a recipient of the Leon Green Award by the Texas Law Review Association, and having a University of Texas Endowed Presidential Scholarship in law created in his name by the Texas Law Review Association.

Retiring from the school of law in 1998, Professor Gibson currently resides in New Mexico with his wife, Beth Gibson.

References
 http://www.reptl.org/Content/WYSIWYG/WilliamGibson.pdf
 https://law.utexas.edu/faculty/william-w-gibson-jr
 http://giving.utexas.edu/archive/eps/?start=250
 http://www.lib.utexas.edu/taro/tslac/20020/tsl-20020.html

1932 births
University of Texas at Austin faculty
Living people